is a Japanese weightlifter. He competed in the men's 62 kg event at the 2016 Summer Olympics.

References

External links
 

1987 births
Living people
Japanese male weightlifters
Olympic weightlifters of Japan
Weightlifters at the 2016 Summer Olympics
Place of birth missing (living people)